Kerry Millikin (born December 10, 1961) is an American equestrian and Olympic medalist. She won a bronze medal in eventing at the 1996 Summer Olympics in Atlanta.

References

External links 
 

1961 births
Living people
American female equestrians
Equestrians at the 1996 Summer Olympics
Medalists at the 1996 Summer Olympics
Olympic bronze medalists for the United States in equestrian
Equestrians at the 1999 Pan American Games
Pan American Games medalists in equestrian
Pan American Games gold medalists for the United States
Medalists at the 1999 Pan American Games
21st-century American women